Cairnorrie is a rural settlement in the Formartine area of Aberdeenshire, Scotland, situated on the B9170 road between Methlick and New Deer.  The primary school at Cairnorrie was closed in 2005.

References 

Villages in Aberdeenshire